This is a list of Billboard magazine's top 50 pop singles of 1958.

See also
1958 in music
List of Billboard number-one singles of 1958
List of Billboard Hot 100 top-ten singles in 1958

References

United States Year-end
Billboard charts